Panmure may refer to:

Places
Panmure (New Zealand electorate), a former New Zealand Parliamentary electorate 
Panmure, New Zealand, a suburb of Auckland
Panmure, Victoria, Australia
Panmure Island, Prince Edward Island, Canada
A rural community in the West Carleton-March Ward of Ottawa, Ontario, Canada

Other uses
Baron Panmure, a title in the Peerage of the United Kingdom
Earl of Panmure, a title in the Peerage of Scotland and Ireland
Fort Panmure, a fort in modern-day Natchez, Mississippi
Lord Panmure (Fox Maule-Ramsay; 1801–1874), British politician
Panmure Castle, ruined castle, seat of the Earls of Panmure
Panmure RFC, a Scottish rugby union side

See also